The United States federal budget for fiscal year 2022 ran from October 1, 2021, to September 30, 2022. The government was initially funded through a series of four temporary continuing resolutions. The final funding package was passed as an omnibus spending bill, the Consolidated Appropriations Act, 2022.

Budget proposal 
The FY2022 budget was the first to not be subject to the spending caps of the Budget Control Act of 2011 due to its expiration.

Appropriations legislation 
A series of three continuing resolutions were passed to initially fund government operations.

On March 9, 2022, the House of Representatives passed the Consolidated Appropriations Act, 2022, as well as a fourth continuing resolution lasting four days.

Reconciliation legislation 
The Build Back Better Act was proposed as the budget reconciliation bill for FY2022.

References

External links 
 Appropriations Status Table

United States federal budget
United States federal budgets by year
117th United States Congress
2021 in American politics